This is a list of Drake Bulldogs football players in the NFL Draft.

Key

Selections

References

Drake

Drake Bulldogs in the NFL Draft